Dominic Kalipersad is a veteran journalist, and one of the most recognizable faces in Trinidad and Tobago. He is the Group Head of News at Caribbean Communications Network (CCN) Limited in Port-of-Spain, where he has taken the flagship television arm, CCN TV6, under his wing.

Kalipersad was previously the Editor In Chief of the Trinidad Guardian newspaper which he modernized from its old broadsheet format into a tabloid.

He was also the Programme Director at Trinidad Broadcasting Company Ltd after serving as News Director there.

Kalipersad is best known as the principal news anchor of Panorama, the 7:00 pm flagship newscast of the now defunct Trinidad and Tobago Television (TTT), from the late 1970s to early 1990s.  He was later Programme Director at the Trinidad Broadcasting Company, and the News Director and anchor at CCN TV6, the position of which he is again the holder. 
While heading the Trinidad Guardian for eleven years, he also served at  Cable News Channel Three (CNC3) as a news anchor filling in for then news anchor, Carla Foderingham with Shelly Dass.

Kalipersad is widely regarded as the journalist most feared by politicians. He has had explosive interviews with politicians like Attorney General Anand Ramlogan and Prime Minister Kamla Persad-Bissessar and is even known to have pulled a live interview with Health Minister Jerry Narace off the air. In addition his television commentaries, 'Lord, Put A Hand!', are respected for their biting, incisive, profound style,

In 1990, Dominic Kalipersad was one of the hostages at Trinidad and Tobago Television during the Jamaat al Muslimeen coup attempt.

He famously refused to be specially selected for release in an exchange negotiated between the then NAR government and the hostage-takers, declaring: "I am not leaving unless everyone (his fellow hostages) else leaves!" Ironically, it was a decision that saved his life as, it is reported, the hostage-takers had planned to 'take him out', if he had accepted the deal.

Kalipersad, a BBC-trained professional, broke the story of the assassination of state prosecutor Dana Seetahal SC on May 4, 2014, and was on the air with the story at six o'clock that morning. He remains the longest-serving broadcast journalist still on the air in 2017 and still commanding the respect of modern audiences.

References

Trinidad and Tobago television personalities
Living people
Trinidad and Tobago people of Indian descent
Year of birth missing (living people)